Arshak II (flourished 4th century, died 369 or 370), also written as Arsaces II or Aršak II, was an Arsacid prince who was King of Armenia from 350 (338/339 according to some scholars) until . Although Arshak's reign opened with a period of peace and stability, it was soon plagued by his conflicts with the Armenian church and nobility, as well as a series of wars between Rome and Persia, during which the Armenian king teetered between the warring sides. Arshak participated in the Roman emperor Julian's ill-fated campaign against Persia; after the consequent Perso-Roman Treaty of 363, Armenia was left to fend for itself against a renewed attack by the Persian king Shapur II. Faced with defections and rebellions among the Armenian nobility, Arshak was lured to Persia for peace negotiations with Shapur, after which he was imprisoned in the Castle of Oblivion in Khuzistan and is said to have committed suicide in captivity. Arshak's reign was followed by the conquest and devastation of Armenia by the Persians, although his son and heir Pap managed to escape and later ascended to the Armenian throne with Roman assistance.

Early life
Arshak II was the second son of Tiran (erroneously called Tigranes VIII in some sources) by an unnamed mother. His father served as the Roman client king of Arsacid Armenia from 338/339 until 350 (although some scholars place the beginning of Arshak's reign in 338/339 and Tiran's reign before that). His date of birth is unknown and little is known about his early life. Around 338, the Sassanid king Shapur II launched a war on Rome and her allies, joined by a wave of persecutions against Christians living in Persia and Mesopotamia. According to the Armenian historian Faustus of Byzantium, King Tiran, Arshak and the queen were captured by the Persians after they were betrayed by Tiran's chamberlain (senekapet). Tiran was accused of collusion with Rome and blinded and imprisoned.

According to one version of the events, Tiran's blinding and the imprisonment of the royal family provoked an uprising in Armenia which drove the Persians out of the country and succeeded in securing the release of the royal family. Shapur II then agreed to recognize Arshak II as King of Armenia in 350. According to another view, Arshak was enthroned as early as 338/339 (possibly at the request of Constantius II) following Shapur's defeat against the Romans near Nisibis.

Reign
The early years of Arshak's reign were peaceful. According to Faustus of Byzantium, Arshak undertook the "ordering of the realm" and brought the Armenian magnates (nakharars) under his control. At the same time, a series of reforms was initiated by Catholicos Nerses I, Arshak's cousin, who became patriarch in 353. Arshak preferred to rule from his royal encampment rather than from the capital Dvin. Early in his reign, Arshak II was courted by the Roman and Sassanid empires, both of which hoped to win Armenia to their side in the ongoing conflicts between them. In about 358, at Constantius II's suggestion, Arshak II married the Greek noblewoman Olympias, daughter of the late consul Ablabius. Constantius also granted Arshak exemption from taxation. The Roman historian Ammianus Marcellinus describes Arshak II as a "steadfast and faithful friend" to the Romans. Faustus, on the other hand, depicts Arshak as vacillating between the Romans and Persians. 

Arshak II, like his father, pursued a policy strongly in favor of Arianism, which led to a falling out with Catholicos Nerses. Nerses was eventually exiled for around nine years along with other anti-Arian bishops and replaced during that time by a royal appointee called Chunak. Arshak's relations with the Armenian nobility also soured, leading him to order the assassinations of prominent nakharars, the extermination of several noble houses (such as the Kamsarakans) and the confiscation of their lands. Arshak ordered the murder of his cousins Gnel (in defiance of the intercession of Nerses) and Tirit. Although Faustus presents this as a story of romance and jealousy involving Parandzem, Gnel's wife whom Arshak later married, it is more likely that Arshak ordered the murders because his cousins, as Arsacid princes and potential pretenders, could have become rallying points for a rebellion against him. He attempted to shore up his rule by founding the city of Arshakavan in Kogovit, which, according to Faustus and Movses Khorenatsi, he populated by granting amnesty to any criminals that would settle there. His plan was opposed by the clergy and nobility, who destroyed the city and killed its inhabitants.

Accoording to Ammianus Marcellinus, Arshak was summoned by Constantius II to Caeserea in 362 and warned to remain loyal to Rome, after which he "never dared to violate any of his promises." Faustus writes that Arshak enjoyed good relations with the Shapur II for some time and even sent a detachment to help Shapur against the Romans at one point, but that hostilities began between Armenia and Persia due to the scheming of Arshak's father-in-law Andovk Siuni and the Persian-backed revolt of Meruzhan Artsruni. In 363, the Romans and Sasanian empires clashed again, and Arshak raided Persian territory in support of Emperor Julian's campaign. The campaign ended with Julian's death, and the new Roman emperor Jovian was forced to negotiate an undesirable peace with Shapur II in which, among other concessions, Rome renounced its alliance with Armenia, leaving the country to face Shapur alone. Although sparapet Vasak Mamikonian won a number of victories over Persian armies (which were joined by Armenian forces led by the renegades Meruzhan Artsruni and Vahan Mamikonian, brother of Vasak) and successfully defended the central province of Ayrarat, more and more Armenian nakharars went over to the Persian side. Faced with this desperate situation, Arshak agreed to go to Persia for peace negotiations with Shapur  after receiving guarantees for his safety. When Arshak II arrived with Vasak Mamikonian, he was imprisoned and possibly blinded, while his general was skinned alive. 

After eliminating Arshak, Shapur laid waste to Armenia, destroying its major cities and deporting their inhabitants to Persia. Meruzhan Artsruni and Vahan Mamikonian, who had renounced Christianity, were installed as governors. Christian Armenians were persecuted and many churches were destroyed and replaced with Zoroastrian fire temples. Arshak's queen Parandzem and his son Pap continued to hold out in the fortress of Artagers for some time, perhaps until early 370, when the fortress was captured and Parandzem was taken to Persia to be put to death. Pap, however, had earlier managed to escape to Roman territory, and returned to Armenia to take the throne with the help of the emperor Valens in 370/371 (other estimates place Pap's ascension to the throne in 367/368).

Imprisonment and death
Arshak was sent to the Castle of Oblivion in Khuzestan. Faustus of Byzantium gives an account of his death in captivity. Sometime in 369 or 370, an Armenian eunuch named Drastamat, who had been a great court official under Arshak and his father, visited the imprisoned king. The king reminisced about his glory days and, feeling depressed, took his visitor's knife and killed himself. Drastamat, moved by what he had just witnessed, took the knife from Arshak II's chest and stabbed himself as well. 

The Roman historian Ammianus Marcellinus gives an alternative account where Arshak is captured, blinded and executed by the Persians.

Legacy
Arshak II is held in poor regard and is described as sinful by the classical Armenian historians, which can partly be explained by his acrimonious relationship with the Armenian church. The Roman historian Ammianus Marcellinus presents Arshak in a more positive light. M. L. Chaumont characterizes Arshak as "weak and indecisive," while Vahan M. Kurkjian writes that although the Armenian king did not lack "intelligence, courage and will power... he committed many mistakes and cruelties which overshadowed his virtues and contributed to his tragic end."

Physical appearance
In Faustus of Byzantium's History of the Armenians, Arshak II is described by Parandzem as unattractively hairy and dark.

Family and issue
Arshak II had two known wives: the Greek noblewoman Olympias and the Armenian noblewoman Parandzem. The chronology of his marriages is unclear, and it is possible that he had more than one wife simultaneously, despite his Christian faith. He was married to Olympias until her death (purportedly by poisoning at the instigation of Parandzem) and had no known children with her. Arshak's other known wife, Parandzem, was a member of the Siuni dynasty and the widow of Arshak's nephew Gnel. Parandzem bore Arshak a son, Pap, who would succeed his father as King of Armenia. Arshak apparently had another son, not mentioned by name in the histories of Faustus and Movses Khorenatsi, who may have fathered Varazdat, Pap's successor as king. This other son is called Trdat in another Armenian source, the anoynymous Vita of St. Nerses.

Cultural depictions 
Arshak II is the titular character of the first Armenian classical opera, Arshak II, written by Tigran Chukhajian and Tovmas Terzian in 1868. Bedros Minasian and Mkrtich Beshiktashlian wrote plays where Arshak is the titular character. He is also a character in the play Nerses the Great, Patron of Armenia by Sargis Vanandetsi. The author and playwright Perch Zeytuntsyan wrote a play (Avervats kaghaki araspel, "The Legend of the Ruined City") and a novel (Arshak Yerkrord) about the Armenian king in 1975 and 1977, respectively. Stepan Zoryan's novel Hayots berd ("Armenian Fortress") is also about Arshak II.

References

Sources
 Faustus of Byzantium, History of the Armenians, 5th Century.
 Movses Khorenatsi, History of Armenia, 5th Century.
 
 Translated from the Armenian: Mihran Kurdoghlian, Badmoutioun Hayots, A. Hador [Armenian History, volume I], Athens, Greece, 1994, pp. 108–111.

See also
 Armenian opera
 Arshak II (opera)
 Dikran Tchouhadjian
 Pharantzem
 Julian's Persian expedition

4th-century kings of Armenia
Armenian Christians
Arian Christians
4th-century Arian Christians
Roman client kings of Armenia
Prisoners and detainees of the Sasanian Empire
Arsacid kings of Armenia
Julian's Persian expedition